Ondřej Sokol (born 16 October 1971), is a Czech director, actor, television presenter and translator.

Sokol was born at Šumperk, Czechoslovakia. After studying five years at Theatre Faculty of the Academy of Performing Arts in Prague (DAMU) he joined a theatre in Mladá Boleslav. Three years later he moved to The Drama Club (DC) in Prague. Following a great success of The Lonesome West he received Alfréd Radok Award in category Talent of the Year and Thálie Award for a young artist up to 33 years of age.

As a television presenter, he hosted all seasons of Tvoje tvář má známý hlas.

Selected performances – director
2013 – The War of The Roses, CZ (also translation)
2011 – Glengarry Glen Ross, DC (also translation)
2011 – A Behanding in Spokane, DC (also translation)
2008 – God of Carnage, DC
2007 – The Playboy of the Western World, DC
2006 – American Buffalo, DC (also translation)
2005 – The Pillowman, DC (also translation)
2004 – Sexual Perversity in Chicago, DC (also translation)
2002 – The Lonesome West, DC (also translation)

Selected performances – actor
2006 – Vicomte de Valmont in Les Liaisons dangereuses, DC
2011–2013 – Partička – Czech comedial improvisation show

Selected filmography
2002 – Útěk do Budína
2020 - O vánoční hvězdě

External links

Czech theatre directors
Czech male stage actors
1971 births
Living people
Czech male film actors
Czech male television actors
People from Šumperk
Recipients of the Thalia Award